Ardvar is a small settlement in Assynt district of Sutherland located within the Highland council area of Scotland. It is located on the banks of Loch Ardbhair (Scottish Gaelic for Ardvar). It is located 3 miles from Drumbeg (nearest other settlement) and 5 from Unapool. It is also 25 miles from Ullapool and the A835 road. 1 mile from the town is the B869 road. Ardvar is elevated at around 20 metres above sea level.

History 
Old maps containing information on Ardvar have existed since 1902. Ardvar is home to a grade II listed building. Some of the areas around Ardvar are conservation areas.

Geography 
Ardvar is located on the banks of Loch Ardbhair, it also sits just north of  a small brook which flows into Loch Ardbhair appropriately called Allt Ardbahir. Additionally closer to the river is the smaller settlement of Rowan Tree. Part of Ardvar is located directly on the lakeshore. The area around Ardvar is surrounded by other lakes and some small brooks as well as some small trails radiating out from the settlement itself. Some of them run back to the B869 and others run North to the coast as well as Loch na Mola, Loch na Fionn Airce and Lochan na Dubh Leitir.

Transportation 
At the road junction on the B869 where the slip road to Ardvar runs there's a small bus stop called Ardvar.

References 

Populated places in Sutherland